Bramley is a suburb of Johannesburg, South Africa. It is located in Region E of the City of Johannesburg Metropolitan Municipality.

History
The suburb is situated on part of an old Witwatersrand farm called Syferfontein. It was established in 1904 and was named after one of the landowners, Edward Bramley.

References

Johannesburg Region E